The Northerners were a political faction of the Joseon Dynasty. It was created after the split of the Easterners in 1591 by Yi Sanhae and his supporters. In 1606, during the reign of Queen Inmok, the Northerners divided into Greater Northerners (led by Heo Gyun) and Smaller Northerners. In 1613, the Greater Northerners split further into Flesh Northerners, Bone Northerners and Middle Northerners. The Smaller Northerners allied with the Westerners and Southerners.

Members
Yi Sanhae
Chung In-hong
Nam Yi-gong
Yi Yicheom

Joseon dynasty
Political history of Korea